Nathan Djebril Koo-Boothe (born 18 July 1985) is a footballer who plays for Three Bridges as a defender.

Career
Born in Westminster, London, Koo-Boothe joined Aldershot Town in December 2007 under contract until the end of the 2007–08 season. He left Aldershot on 2 March 2008, after failing to make an appearance in the Conference National. He joined Jamaican outfit Portmore United in summer 2008.

On 14 July 2009, it was confirmed that he would join Crewe Alexandra on trial. He went on to join Maltese Premier League club Mosta in 2009.

Koo-Boothe had a trial spell with South African club Kaizer Chiefs in January 2011, before rejoining Kettering Town in March 2011. He joined Spanish club CD Castellón in December 2011.

In January 2012 he moved to Hayes & Yeading United.

References

External links

1985 births
Living people
Footballers from Westminster
Association football defenders
English footballers
Jamaican footballers
Watford F.C. players
Milton Keynes Dons F.C. players
Grays Athletic F.C. players
Kettering Town F.C. players
Aldershot Town F.C. players
Portmore United F.C. players
Mosta F.C. players
CD Castellón footballers
Hayes & Yeading United F.C. players
Tooting & Mitcham United F.C. players
Farnborough F.C. players
Eastbourne Town F.C. players
Cray Wanderers F.C. players
English Football League players
National League (English football) players
Expatriate footballers in Jamaica
English people of Jamaican descent
Black British sportspeople